Don't shoot the messenger may refer to:
 Shooting the messenger, a metaphorical phrase for blaming the bearer of bad news
 Don't Shoot the Messenger, an EP by Puscifer